Decollidrillia is a genus of sea snails, marine gastropod mollusks in the family Turridae, the turrids.

Species
Species within the genus Decollidrillia include:
 Decollidrillia nigra Habe & Ito, 1965

References

External links
 Bouchet, P.; Kantor, Y. I.; Sysoev, A.; Puillandre, N. (2011). A new operational classification of the Conoidea (Gastropoda). Journal of Molluscan Studies. 77(3): 273-308.
 
 Worldwide Mollusc Species Data Base: Turridae

Monotypic gastropod genera